Muhammad ibn al-Mahruq was a minister in the Emirate of Granada. He stayed in the post at the accession of Muhammad IV, and a few months later elevated to vizier, replacing Abu al-Hasan ibn Mas'ud who died. From late 1326, Ibn al-Mahruq was involved in a civil war against a political rival, Uthman ibn Abi al-Ula. To end the civil war, Muhammad IV ordered him assassinated on 6 November 1328, during his meeting with the Sultan's grandmother Fatima bint al-Ahmar.

Citations

References
 
 
 

Viziers of the Emirate of Granada
14th-century people from al-Andalus